De Appel is a contemporary arts centre, located in Amsterdam. Exhibitions, publications and discursive events are the main activities of De Appel. In 1994, Saskia Bos established an intensive course, called 'The Curatorial Programme'. Over a period of eight months a selective group of five to six people are trained to become a curator. 
At the end of 2012, former director  initiated a new professional development programme in collaboration with The Fair Gallery: the Gallerist programme. This programme was the first practice-oriented educational course for (aspiring) gallery owners and (young) art professionals who wanted to deepen their curatorial and business competencies in the commercial segment of the art world.
Wies Smals established de Appel in 1975.

References

Art in Amsterdam